Batusangkar (batu: stone, rock, sangkar: cage) is the capital of the Tanah Datar regency of West Sumatra, Indonesia. It is known as "the city of culture".

History
The town is near the former seat of the Minangkabau royalty established by Adityawarman in Pagaruyung, represented by the reconstructed Pagaruyung Palace. A number of stones bearing inscriptions (prasasti) left by Adityavarman that remain in the region are the first written records in West Sumatra. After the death of Adityawarman (1375) no more stone inscriptions were produced.

Fort van der Capellen

The town was known as Fort van der Capellen during colonial times, when it was a Dutch outpost established during the Padri War (1821–37). The fort was built between 1822 and 1826 and named after the  Governor-General of the Dutch East Indies, Godert van der Capellen. The city was officially renamed Batusangkar in 1949, replacing its colonial name.

Indo Jelito building
Indo Jelito building is the residence of the regent of Tanah Datar. Each regent who has served, has automatically lived here. This building itself is a former residence of the Dutch resident Van der Capellen during colonial times, with a strong architectural style of art deco style buildings that characterized the Dutch.

External links
 
  Tanah Datar Menyimpan JejakAdityawarman

Populated places in West Sumatra
Regency seats of West Sumatra